Khaniqa District is a district of Jowzjan Province in Afghanistan.

References

District Map 
 Map of Settlements AIMS, August 2002

Districts of Jowzjan Province